Here and Now is an American drama television series created by Alan Ball. The series consists of 10 episodes and premiered on HBO on February 11, 2018. Starring Holly Hunter and Tim Robbins, the series focuses on a contemporary multiracial family in the Portland area. The show's plot involves many issues including race, identity, and mental illness.

On April 25, 2018, HBO cancelled the series after one season.

Cast and characters

Main
 Holly Hunter as Audrey Bayer, a therapist
 Tim Robbins as Greg Boatwright, Audrey's husband and philosophy professor
 Jerrika Hinton as Ashley Collins, adopted by the Bayer-Boatwrights from Liberia, now creator and owner of a retail fashion website
 Raymond Lee as Duc Bayer-Boatwright, adopted from Vietnam when he was five, now a successful life coach and womanizer
 Daniel Zovatto as Ramon Bayer-Boatwright, adopted from an orphanage in Colombia at 18 months, now a college senior studying video game design
 Sosie Bacon as Kristen Bayer-Boatwright, a junior in high school and her parents' only biological child
 Joe Williamson as Malcolm Collins, Ashley's husband and Duc's best friend, an assistant personal trainer for the Portland women’s soccer team
 Andy Bean as Henry, a free spirit who falls in love with Ramon
 Peter Macdissi as Dr. Farid Shokrani, Ramon's therapist
 Marwan Salama as Navid Shokrani
 Necar Zadegan as Layla Shokrani

Guest starring
 Trent Garrett as Randy
 Kevin Bigley as Michael 
 Cynthia Ettinger as Lydia 
 Ted Levine as Ike Bayer, Audrey's schizophrenic brother
 Niousha Noor as Donya, Dr. Shokrani's mother

Production
HBO ordered the series in July 2016.

Casting
On January 31, 2018, it was announced that Stephanie Arcila and Erin Carufel signed onto the series in the recurring roles of Mami and Wendy, respectively.

Filming
The series is partially filmed in Portland, Oregon.

Marketing
The teaser trailer of the first season was released in December 2017.

Episodes

Reception
On Rotten Tomatoes, the first season has a 24% approval rating based 49 reviews from critics, with an average rating of 4.54/10. The critics consensus reads, "Here and Now clearly has a point it wants to make, but a nebulous plot and unfocused character development stand in the way of its potential." On Metacritic, it has a score of 46 out of 100 based on 31 reviews.

References

External links
 
 

2018 American television series debuts
2018 American television series endings
2010s American comedy-drama television series
HBO original programming
English-language television shows
Television shows filmed in Oregon
Television shows set in Portland, Oregon
Television series by Home Box Office